The Sichtungsgarten Weihenstephan (Trial Garden Weihenstephan) is a 7 ha garden maintained by the Fachhochschule Weihenstephan. It is located at Am Staudengarten 9, Weihenstephan, Freising, Bavaria, Germany, and is open daily from April to October. Admission is free. Along with several other gardens located at Weihenstephan (Hofgarten, Oberdickgarten, Parterregarten, Kleingarten, Arboretum), the Sichtungsgarten is part of the Weihenstephaner Gärten (Gardens of Weihenstephan). 

The garden was founded by Richard Hansen in 1948. It now contains a large variety of trees, shrubs and herbaceous perennials and is primarily focused on education and training for students of horticulture and landscape architecture.

The garden is renowned for its spectacular flower beds and borders, best to be appreciated between June and September.

See also 
 List of botanical gardens in Germany

External links 
 Sichtungsgarten Weihenstephan
 Garden map
 Freundeskreis Weihenstephaner Gärten e.V.
 GardenVisit entry
 BGCI entry
 Flickr photographs

Weihenstephan, Sichtungsgarten
Weihenstephan, Sichtungsgarten
Buildings and structures in Freising (district)